Rofuh Chah (also Romanized as Rofūh Chāh; also known as Rafū Chāh, Rofū Chāh, Roof Chah, Rūbāchāh, Rubachakh, Rūfchā, and Rūfchāh) is a village in Nowsher-e Koshk-e Bijar Rural District, Khoshk-e Bijar District, Rasht County, Gilan Province, Iran. At the 2006 census, its population was 390, in 97 families.

References 

Populated places in Rasht County